

Storms
Note:  indicates the name was retired after that usage in the respective basin

 Nada (2016) – made landfall in Tamil Nadu, near Karaikal, as a depression killed at least 12 people.

 Nadia (1994) – a powerful tropical cyclone that struck both Madagascar and Mozambique in March 1994.

 Nadine
 1948 – never affected land.
 1956 – a Category 1 typhoon that stalled and then weakened, never made landfall.
 1960 – a powerful tropical storm that affected the Philippines.
 1962 – a powerful tropical storm that affected the southern parts of China and hit the Hindustan peninsula.
 1968 – a powerful tropical storm that hit Taiwan.
 1971 – a powerful category 5 typhoon that hit Taiwan and China.
 1974 – did not make landfall.
 1978 – stayed at sea and was the first severe tropical storm of the season it lived at least 1 week.
 2000 – did not threaten land.
 2012 – long-lived hurricane that churned in the open ocean.
 2018 – never affected land.

 Nakri
 2002 – brushed Taiwan and Okinawa.
 2008 – remained out at sea.
 2014 – affected the Ryukyu Islands and the Korean Peninsula.
 2019 – developed west of the main Philippine Islands and made landfall in Southern Vietnam.

 Nalgae
 2005 – never affected land.
 2011 – a powerful tropical cyclone that struck the Philippines, and it affected Hainan, China as a weak tropical storm. 
 2017 – never affected land.
 2022 – a deadly tropical cyclone that caused widespread damage across the Philippines and later impacted Hong Kong and Macau.

 Namtheun
 2004 – a powerful Category 4 typhoon that hit the coast of Japan in the form of a tropical storm.
 2010 – a weak tropical storm that affected Taiwan and parts of China.
 2016 – a Category 3 typhoon that only slightly affected Japan.
 2021 – never affected land.

 Nana
 1990 – a Category 1 hurricane that never threatened land. 
 2008 – short-lived weak tropical storm that remained at sea.
 2020 – a Category 1 hurricane that made landfall in Belize, earliest fourteenth named storm on record.

 Nanauk (2014) – no threat to land.

 Nancy
 1945 – tropical storm that hit South China.
 1950 – no threat to land.
 1954 – a category 2 typhoon that hit the northern Philippines and Vietnam also affected the southern provinces of China.
 1958 – a Category 5 typhoon that mostly stayed at sea.
 1961 – an extremely powerful tropical cyclone of the 1961 and one of the most intense tropical cyclones on record.
 1964 – no threat to land.
 1965 – no threat to land. 
 1966 (March) – a Category 2 tropical cyclone that affected Mauritius and Réunion.
 1966 (November) – strong tropical storm that hit the Philippines.
 1970 – a powerful category 4 typhoon that affected the Philippines.
 1972 – a Category 3 typhoon mostly stayed at sea.
 1076 – stayed at sea.
 1977 – a weak Category 1 tropical cyclone that hit Queensland. 
 1979 – a weak tropical storm that hit Hainan and after made a second coast of Vietnam.
 1982 –  a destructive typhoon that moved through Vietnam and the Philippines during October 1982. 
 1986 – a Category 1 typhoon that hit Taiwan passed off the coast of China and South Korea
 1989 – a Category 1 typhoon that had little effect on Japan and the Kuril Islands.
 1990 – made landfall near Byron Bay.
 2005 – the second in a series of four severe tropical cyclones to impact the Cook Islands during February 2005.

 Nando
 2005 – a category 4 typhoon that remained on the high seas. 
 2009 – a typhoon struck China in September 2009.
 2014 – a tropical storm that affected the Philippines, Taiwan, China, South Korea and Japan.
 2017 – tropical depression that hit South China and Vietnam.
 2021 – no threat to land.

 Nanette
 1947 – a Category 2 typhoon impacts Taiwan and China.
 1967 – no threat to land.
 1971 – threatened southern Baja California but turned west before making landfall.
 1975 – no threat to land.

 Nangka
 2003 – tracked well east of Japan.
 2008  – traversed the Philippines and then made its final landfall in Guangdong, China.
 2015 – a powerful Category 4 super typhoon that affected the Mariana Islands.
 2020 – a weak tropical cyclone which impacted Hainan and parts of Indochina, which had been affected by Tropical Storm Linfa just days earlier.

 Nanmadol
 2004 – last of four consecutive tropical cyclones to strike the Philippines in 2004
 2011 – hit the Philippines, Taiwan, and East China; second most intense tropical cyclone worldwide in 2011
 2017 – a tropical storm that impacted southern Japan
 2022 – an intense typhoon recently became the strongest tropical cyclone of 2022, threatened Japan.

 Naomi
 1961 – did not make landfall.
 1968 – a short-lived Category 1 hurricane that made landfall in Mexico's Pacific coast during the 1968 Pacific hurricane season. 
 1976 – a weak tropical storm that hit Mexico.
 1983 – remained out at sea.
 1993 – the first cyclone of the 1993/94 season storm moved south and strengthened into a Category 3 before making landfall Western Australia.

 Narda
 1983 – strong tropical storm that slightly affected Hawaii.
 1989 – did not make landfall.
 2001 – did not make landfall.
 2013 – did not make landfall.
 2019 – a short-lived tropical storm that remained close to the Pacific coast of Mexico, causing flash flooding and mudslides in southwestern Mexico and the Baja California Peninsula in late September 2019. 

 Narelle (2013) – A severe tropical cyclone that affected western parts of Australia in 2013, causing 14 fatalities.

 Nargis (2008) – was an extremely destructive and deadly tropical cyclone that caused the worst natural disaster in the recorded history of Myanmar during early May 2008.

 Nari
 2001 – an unusually long-lived category 3 typhoon which took an erratic, two week track near Taiwan during September 2001.
 2007 – a small but powerful typhoon which struck the Korean Peninsula in early September 2007.
 2013 – a strong and deadly tropical cyclone that first struck Luzon before striking Vietnam.
 2019 – a weak tropical storm minor impact on Japan.

 Nate
 2005 — strong category 1 hurricane that stayed out in the open ocean.
 2011 — weak short-lived Category 1 hurricane that made landfall in the Mexican state of Veracruz.
 2017 — made landfall in Nicaragua as a moderate tropical storm, emerged into the northwestern Caribbean Sea, then strengthened into a strong Category 1 hurricane in the Gulf of Mexico before making landfall in Louisiana.

 Nathan
 1990 – entered the China Sea
1993 – crossed Japan
 1998 – approached the Queensland coast
 2015 – hit the Arnhem Land

 Nell
 1990 – hit southeast Asia.
 1993 – hit the Philippines.

 Nelson
 1983 – the second tropical cyclone to strike the Philippines within a week in March 1982.
 1985 – the worst tropical cyclone to affect Southern China in 16 years.
 1988 – a Category 5 typhoon mostly stayed at sea.

 Neneng
 1963 – struck Hong Kong killing 3 people.
 1967 – did not make landfall.
 1971  – traversed the Philippines and made landfall near the demilitarized zone between North and South Vietnam as a Category 4-equivalent typhoon.
 1975 – did not affect land.
 1979 – struck China and South Korea.
 1983 – short-lived tropical depression that was only recognized by PAGASA and the Hong Kong Observatory.
 1987 – affected the Philippines, Taiwan, and China during September 1987.
 1991 – a mid-season typhoon that struck Japan during 1991.
 1095 – powerful typhoon that stayed at sea.
 1999 – struck China and Hong Kong.
 2006 – led to 33 people dead or missing after becoming an extratropical low.
 2014 – a powerful tropical cyclone which affected Japan in early October 2014.
 2018 – a weak tropical storm that caused flooding in the far northern regions of the Philippines and Southern China.
 2022 – a typhoon which recently affected northern Philippines, Taiwan and  Vietnam.
 Neoguri
 2002 – approached Japan.
 2008 – the earliest tropical cyclone on record to strike China. 
 2014 – A Category 5 storm that eventually made landfall in Japan and Korea.
 2019 – did not affect land.

 Nepartak
 2003  – a modest tropical cyclone that struck the central Philippines and the southern China island of Hainan in November 2003.
 2009 – did not affect land.
 2016 – a very powerful storm which impacted Taiwan and devastated East China.
 2021 - a weak storm which affected Japan.

 Nesat
 2005 – approached Japan.
 2011 – the most powerful tropical cyclone to directly impact China since 2005. 
 2017 – a strong tropical cyclone that impacted Taiwan and Fujian, China.
 2022 — a typhoon which recently affected northern Philippines, Taiwan and  Vietnam.

 Nestor
 1997 – a Category 5 super typhoon that affected the Northern Mariana Islands.
 2019 – a short lived tropical storm that affected the Southeastern United States.

 Newton
 1980 – a weak tropical storm that dissipated before making landfall in Mexico.
 1986 – one of the few tropical cyclones that were intercepted by Hurricane Hunter flights during the active 1986 it made landfall on the Baja California Peninsula in September of that year, causing minor damage.
 1992 – did not affect land.
 2016 – the first tropical cyclone to make landfall on the Baja California Peninsula at hurricane strength since Hurricane Odile in 2014.
 2022 – formed near southwestern Mexico and then moved out to sea, caused minor effects on land.

 Nicholas
 1985 – severe tropical cyclone that did not threaten land.
 1996 — made landfall west of Derby, Australia.
 2003 – long-lived and erratic tropical storm.
 2008 – made landfall north of Carnarvon, Australia.
2021 – Category 1 hurricane that made landfall near Sargent, Texas,  bringing heavy rainfall and storm surge to parts of the U.S. Gulf Coast.

 Nichole (1998) – a weak  short-lived tropical storm which affected western Taiwan and southeastern China, causing minimal damage.

 Nicole
 1998 – a late season storm which was only briefly a hurricane west of the Azores and never approached land.
 2004 – a short-lived storm that formed from a low-pressure area near Bermuda and headed towards Nova Scotia.
 2010 – a weak tropical storm that affected Cuba and brought heavy flooding to Jamaica; later contributed to the formation of a large extra-tropical storm over the East Coast of the United States.
 2016 – a long-lived Category 4 hurricane that made landfall on Bermuda.
 2022 – Category 1 hurricane which made landfall in The Bahamas and Florida.

 Nida
 2004 – a Category 5 super typhoon that formed southeast of the Philippines in mid-May that reached peak strength not far from the east-central Philippines and finally became extratropical east of Japan.
 2008 – a powerful Category 5 super typhoon that formed within a monsoon trough 545 miles (880 km) southeast of Guam in late November and reached 10-minute peak winds of 130 mph (215 km/h)
 2016 – impacted the Philippines and South China as a severe tropical storm.
 2021 – did not affect land.

 Nilam (2012) – was the deadliest tropical cyclone to directly affect South India since Cyclone Jal in 2010.

 Nilofar (2014) – was at the time, the third-strongest cyclone in the Arabian Sea.

 Niran (2021) – a Category 5 tropical cyclone which affected Queensland and New Caledonia.

 Nisarga (2020) – was the strongest tropical cyclone to strike the Indian state of Maharashtra in the month of June since 1891.

 Nigel – a severe tropical cyclone that affected Northern Vanuatu and the Fijian islands in 1985 causing 25 fatalities.

 Nina
 1953 – a powerful category 4 typhoon that hit China.
 1957 – the final tropical storm and hurricane of the 1957 and the last storm to form during the active Central Pacific hurricane season this year. 
 1960 – never made landfall.
 1963 – did not affect land.
 1966 –  was a Category 1 tropical cyclone.
 1968 – crossed the Philippines.
 1972 – did not affect land.
 1975 – struck Taiwan. Contributed to the collapse of the Banqiao Dam in central China, killing around 200,000.
 1978 – 59 people died and more than 500,000 were in evacuation centers in the Philippines.
 1981 – a weak tropical storm that affected Taiwan and hit China.
 1984 – did not affect land.
 1987 – the most intense typhoon to strike the Philippines since Typhoon Irma in 1981.
 1992 – did not affect land.
 1993 – a significant tropical cyclone, which impacted six island nations and caused several deaths.
 1995 – a weak tropical storm hit the Philippines and China.
 2003 – a moderate tropical cyclone that caused a swath of damage stretching from the Philippines to Vietnam in August 2003. 
 2004 – the fourth-costliest typhoon on record.
 2008 – a powerful cyclone that caused widespread destruction along its path in September 2008.
 2012 – a Category 3 typhoon mostly stayed at sea.
 2016 – a late-season powerful storm that affected the Philippines.

 Nisha
 1983 – formed and existed at the same time as Severe Tropical Cyclone Oscar.
 1993 – remained away from highly populated islands.
 2008 – a fairly weak but catastrophic tropical cyclone that struck Sri Lanka, and India which killed over 200.
 2010 – weak storm that remained away from highly populated islands.

 Nivar (2020) – a tropical cyclone which brought severe impacts to portions of Tamil Nadu and Andhra Pradesh in late November 2020.

Nock-ten
 2004 –  struck Taiwan.
 2011 – Struck the Philippines and Vietnam killing 119 people and causing damage worth US$126 million.
 2016 – a very powerful late-season Category 5 super typhoon that threatened the Philippines.

 Noel
 1995 – Category 1 hurricane that remained far from land.
 2001 – Category 1 hurricane that never threatened land.
 2007 – Category 1 hurricane that affected parts of the Greater Antilles, The Bahamas, the Eastern United States and Atlantic Canada, killing 169 people and causing 580 million (2007 USD) in damage.

 Nona
 1952 – a Category 1 typhoon that struck the Philippines and southern China.
 1994 – a short-lived tropical storm that did not affect land.
 2015 – a Category 4 typhoon that made multiple landfalls in the Philippines.

 Nora
 1945 – did not affect land.
 1951 – a Category 3 typhoon hits Philippines, South China and Vietnam.
 1955 – aCategory 2 typhoon slightly touches Japan.
 1959 – tropical storm that hit the Philippines and China.
 1962 – a Category 1 typhoon passed off the coast of China where it hit the Korean Peninsula and Japan.
 1964 – tropical storm that hit the Philippines.
 1967 – a Category 1 typhoon hit the Taiwan and China.
 1970 - remnants contributed to the formation of the Bhola Cyclone.
 1973 – one of the most intense tropical cyclones ever recorded.
 1976 – struck the central Philippines.
 1985 – not a threat to land.
 1991 – a Category 2 hurricane that dissipated before landfall.
 1997 – a powerful Category 4 hurricane that made landfall in Baja California, and moved into Arizona.
 2003 – a Category 2 hurricane that became the strongest storm of the season, made landfall as a tropical depression.
 2009 – no threat to land.
 2015 – approached Hawaii but dissipated before landfall.
 2018 – made landfall in Far North Queensland, causing more than US$25 million in damages and economic losses.
 2021 – a large Category 1 hurricane that made landfall in the Mexican state of Jalisco.
 Norbert
 1984 – took an erratic track several hundred miles south of Baja California, making landfall there.
 1990 – stayed at sea.
 2008 – struck Baja California.
 2014 – a Category 3 that affected Western Mexico and the Baja California Peninsula.
 2020 – never threatened land.
 Norma
 1970 – storm formed off the coast of Mexico and intensified rapidly, peaking as a strong tropical storm on September 3 before starting a weakening trend which saw it dissipate before making landfall on Baja California.
 1974 – a category 1 hurricane triggered mudslides in and around Acapulco, resulting in three fatalities.
 1981 – one of the two hurricanes to make landfall during the 1981.
 1987 – a Category 1 hurricane that hit Mexico as a depression.
 1993 – stayed at sea.
 2005 – stayed at sea.
 2017 – stayed at sea.

 Norman
 1978 – a Category 4 hurricane that struck California as a tropical depression.
 1982 – a Category 2 hurricane that turned toward Baja California.
 1994 – weak, short-lived tropical storm.
 2000 (March) – no direct impact on Western Australia.
 2000 (September) – struck Mexico.
 2006 – near southwestern Mexico.
 2012 – weak and short lived, it also struck Mexico.
 2018 – powerful Category 4 hurricane that moved into the Central Pacific.

 Norris
 1980 – struck Taiwan.
 1983 – short-lived tropical storm which stayed at sea.
 1986 – late-season typhoon which spanned two calendar years and struck the Philippines.

 Noru
 2004 – stayed at sea.
 2011 – merged with the extratropical remnants of Talas.
 2017 – impacted Japan and is tied as the second longest lasting northwest Pacific tropical cyclone on record.
 2022 – an intense tropical cyclone that impacted the Philippines and Vietnam.

 Noul
 2007 – Affected Vietnam
 2015 - A Category 5 typhoon that caused minimal damage in the Philippines.
 2020 – A tropical storm that caused minor damage in Vietnam.

 Nuri
 2008 – affected the Philippines, Hong Kong and China during August 2008.
 2014 – the third most intense tropical cyclone in 2014.
 2020 – made landfall in the Philippines and affected Southern China.

 Nyatoh (2021) – a category 4 typhoon, stayed at sea.

See also

Tropical cyclone
Tropical cyclone naming
European windstorm names
Atlantic hurricane season
List of Pacific hurricane seasons
South Atlantic tropical cyclone

References

General

 
 
 
 
 
 
 
 
 
 
 
 
 
 
 
 
 

 
 
 
 
 

N